Orenia salinaria is a bacterium from the genus of Orenia which has been isolated from a commercial saltern from Salin-de-Giraud in France.

References

Clostridia
Bacteria described in 2000